Three ships of the Royal Navy have borne the name HMS Welfare. A fourth was planned but never completed:

  was a King's ship mentioned in 1350.
  was a captain's John Strong ship, commanding which he made a first landing on Falkland Islands in 1690.
 HMS Welfare was to have been an Admiralty modified W-class destroyer. She was laid down in 1918 but cancelled later that year.
  was an  launched in 1943 and broken up in 1957.

Royal Navy ship names